The Internet Open Trading Protocol (IOTP) is a system-independent protocol that provides an interoperable and standardized payment framework for electronic commerce, which tries to replicate real-world trading processes as closely as possible.

IOTP systems can include a variety of different payment systems including digital cash, electronic checks, and debit cards. Various payment transaction data are encapsulated within specific IOTP messages (customer, merchant, credit checker, certifier, bank and delivery handler).

References

External links
  - Internet Open Trading Protocol (IOTP) (April 2000)
  - Internet Open Trading Protocol (IOTP) Errata (March 2003)
  - Digital Signatures for the v1.0 IOTP (April 2000)
  - Internet Open Trading Protocol (IOTP) HTTP Supplement (September 2000)
  - Secure Electronic Transaction (SET) Supplement for the v1.0 IOTP (2003)
  - Payment Application Programmers Interface (API) for the v1.0 IOTP (November 2004)

Internet protocols
Application layer protocols
Industry-specific XML-based standards